La taberna del Buda (The Buddha's Tavern) is the Spanish band Café Quijano's 3rd album.

Track listing

 "Nada de ná" – 3:41
 "De piratas" – 3:49
 "Desde Brazil" – 3:53
 "Lucía, la corista  – 4:19
 "Qué le debo a la vida" – 4:02
 "En aquel hotel jamaicano" – 3:52
 "La taberna del Buda" – 3:47
 "Otra vez (Qué pena de mi)" – 4:20
 "Las llaves de Raquel" – 3:52
 "Qué poca cosa" – 4:09
 "En mis besos" – 3:35
 "Otra vez (Qué pena de mi) con Olga Tañón" – 4:18

Commercial performance
The album stayed on Spanish charts for 67 weeks, selling nearly 500,000 units. Overall it has shifted one million copies.

References

Café Quijano albums
2001 albums